Igor Vladimirovich Pavlov (born 18 July 1979 in Moscow) is a Russian pole vaulter.

He won the silver medal at the 2003 Summer Universiade, and in the following years he became indoor champion on national, European and World level.

He won the gold medal in the pole vault at the 2009 Maccabiah Games.

International competitions

See also
List of European Athletics Indoor Championships medalists (men)
List of Maccabiah medalists in athletics (men)
List of IAAF World Indoor Championships medalists (men)

References 

 

1979 births
Living people
Athletes from Moscow
Russian male pole vaulters
Olympic male pole vaulters
Olympic athletes of Russia
Athletes (track and field) at the 2004 Summer Olympics
Athletes (track and field) at the 2008 Summer Olympics
Maccabiah Games medalists in athletics
Competitors at the 2009 Maccabiah Games
Maccabiah Games gold medalists for Russia
Universiade medalists in athletics (track and field)
Universiade silver medalists for Russia
Medalists at the 2003 Summer Universiade
World Athletics Indoor Championships winners
European Athletics Indoor Championships winners
Russian Athletics Championships winners
Jewish male athletes (track and field)
World Athletics Championships athletes for Russia